Kalikapatadi is a dance mostly performed in West Bengal state of India. It is commonly known as the Folk Dance of Howrah District. 

This form is based on stories of Lord Shiva. Most of the dance is on account of killing of evil by Shiva and then cooling his anger.

Dances of India
Culture of West Bengal